Cray is a settlement in Perth and Kinross, Scotland, about  northeast of Kirkmichael, on the Shee Water at the foot of Mount Blair.

Cray Parish Church, a Category C listed building dating to 1844, is located on the B591, the main road passing through the area.

Cray House was formerly owned by Rev. H. M. Williamson.

References

External links
Photographs in and around Cray - Geograph.co.uk

Populated places in Perth and Kinross